Diakonessenhuis is a hospital in Paramaribo, Suriname. It was founded as the Protestant hospital of Paramaribo.

History 

In 1946 a foundation was set up to start a Diakonessenhuis in Paramaribo, but only when the director of the Diakonessenhuis in Utrecht, dr. M.A. van Melle, took over the initiative in 1955 and contacted the Dutch public broadcaster NCRV did developments grow more seriously. In 1960 a fundraising show was broadcast on television which generated more than 2 million Dutch guilders.

In late 1961 construction was started, and the hospital eventually opened on 30 November 1962.

See also 
Academic Hospital Paramaribo, a university hospital in Paramaribo;
's Lands Hospitaal, a general hospital in Paramaribo
Sint Vincentius Hospital, a Catholic hospital in Paramaribo

References

External links 
Official site

Hospitals in Suriname